Stele II is an abstract sculpture, constructed in 1973, by Ellsworth Kelly.

Located at the National Gallery of Art Sculpture Garden, it reflects the artist's move to the countryside, and landscape.

See also
 List of public art in Washington, D.C., Ward 2

References

External links
Waymarking
Virtual Globe Trotting

Outdoor sculptures in Washington, D.C.
1973 sculptures
Collections of the National Gallery of Art
Steel sculptures in Washington, D.C.
National Gallery of Art Sculpture Garden